Al-Haras Al-Malaki, was an Iraqi football team based in Baghdad. They participated in the first ever national cup tournament held in Iraq: the 1948–49 Iraq FA Cup. They also won seven Iraq Central FA League titles in a row (the top-tier league for teams from Baghdad and its neighbouring cities between 1948 and 1973), making them the most successful team in the tournament's history.

Honours

Iraq Central FA League
Winners (7): 1949–50, 1950–51, 1951–52, 1952–53, 1953–54, 1954–55, 1955–56 (record)
Army Cup
Winners (4): 1948, 1950, 1955, 1956 (shared record)
Jamal Baban Cup
Winners (2): 1948, 1951

References

Football clubs in Baghdad
Military association football clubs
Defunct football clubs in Iraq